The Akademie der Künste der DDR was the central art academy of the German Democratic Republic (DDR). It existed under different names from 1950 to 1993. Then it merged with the "Akademie der Künste Berlin (West)" to become the Academy of Arts, Berlin.

History

Deutsche Akademie der Künste 

The Deutsche Akademie der Künste was founded on 24 March 1950. The founding act was performed by Minister President of the GDR Otto Grotewohl. It considered itself the legal successor to the Prussian Academy of Arts.

Akademie der Künste der DDR 
In April 1974, it received the designation Academy of Arts of the German Democratic Republic (AdK). The AdK "helps with the development and dissemination of a partisan and popular art of socialist realism, which contributes to the formation of socialist personalities, an art which enriches the spiritual life of the people and acts as a component of the culturally rich way of life under socialism. It makes an important contribution to the research, cultivation, development and dissemination of the cultural and artistic heritage." (Statute of the AdK of the GDR of 26 January 1978)

This had become vacant after the move of the Volkskammer of the GDR to the Palast der Republik. In 1987, after more than ten years of restoration work, the building at Robert-Koch-Platz was occupied again.

Akademie der Künste zu Berlin 
From 1990 it bore the name "Akademie der Künste zu Berlin".

It merged with the "Akademie der Künste Berlin (West)" into the joint Academy of Arts, Berlin in 1993.

Archives 

Activities

Sections 
The Academy was divided into different sections
 Literature and Philology
 Fine Arts
 Music
 Performing Arts

Activities 
In addition to exhibitions, concerts, readings, conferences, symposia and archiving, the extensive activities also included the supervision of numerous artists.

Master classes 
Highly regarded were master classes with such prominent teachers as Hanns Eisler, Paul Dessau, Günter Kochan and Dieter Zechlin (music), as well as

Presidents 
 Heinrich Mann, 1950 (nominell)
 Arnold Zweig, 1950–1953
 Johannes R. Becher, 1953–1956
 Otto Nagel, 1956–1962
 Willi Bredel, 1962–1964
 Konrad Wolf, 1965–1982
 Manfred Wekwerth, 1982–1990
 Heiner Müller, 1990–1993

Paul Dessau (1957–62), Ernst Hermann Meyer (1965–69), Dieter Zechlin (1970–78), Fritz Cremer (1974–83), Wieland Förster (1979–90), Werner Stötzer (1990–93), Ruth Zechlin (1990–93) were among the vice-presidents.

Members 

Membership of the Academy was an honour, awarded for special artistic achievements.
The founding members included among others Johannes R. Becher, Bertolt Brecht, Hanns Eisler, Otto Nagel, Anna Seghers, Helene Weigel and Friedrich Wolf.
Other  were among others Fritz Cremer, and Paul Dessau.

Thomas Mann was appointed honorary member in 1955

The Corresponding Members included among others Benjamin Britten, Charles Chaplin, Aram Khachaturian, Otto Dix, Hans Erni, Gabriel García Marquez, Pablo Neruda, Laurence Olivier and Pablo Picasso.

Prizes 
The prizes awarded by the Academy were:
 Heinrich Mann Prize for essay writing (since 1953),
 Käthe Kollwitz Prize for visual arts (since 1960),
 Lion Feuchtwanger Prize for historical prose (since 1971),
 Alex Wedding Prize for children's and youth literature (since 1968),
 F.-C. Weiskopf Prize for particularly "language-critical and language-accentuating" literature (since 1957),
 Will Lammert Prize for young sculptors (since 1962),
 Anna Seghers Prize for young authors (since 1986)
 Konrad Wolf Prize for the performing arts (since 1988)

References

Further reading 
 
 Anke Scharnhorst, Helmut Müller-Enbergs: . Volume 1, Christoph Links Verlag, Berlin 2010.
 Bernd-Rainer Barth: Wer war wer in der DDR?. Volume 2, Christoph Links Verlag, Berlin 2010.
 Hans Gerhard Hannesen: Die Akademie der Künste in Berlin. Facetten einer 300jährigen Geschichte. Berlin 2005.
 Andreas Herbst, Winfried Ranke, Jürgen Winkler (ed.): So funktionierte die DDR. Lexikon der Organisationen und Institutionen, vol. 1, Reinbek bei Hamburg 1994

External links 
 Geschichte der Akademie der Künste
 Wer war wer in der DDR?

1950 establishments in East Germany